Berlin-Brandenburg (Berlin/Brandenburg Metropolitan Region) is one of eleven metropolitan regions of Germany.

Berlin-Brandenburg may also refer to:

Transportation
 Berlin Brandenburg Airport (BER/EDDB), Berlin, Germany
 Berlin Brandenburg Airport railway station (disambiguation)
 Flughafen Berlin Brandenburg GmbH (FBB), Berlin-Brandenburg Airports; airport authority of Berlin, Germany
 Verkehrsverbund Berlin-Brandenburg (VBB), Berlin-Brandenburg Transport; public transit authority of the state of Berlin and state of Brandenburg in Germany

Organisations
 Rundfunk Berlin-Brandenburg (rbb), Berlin-Brandenburg Broadcasting
 Berlin Brandenburg International School, Potsdam, Germany
 Berlin-Brandenburg Academy of Sciences and Humanities
 Berlin-Brandenburg Academy Award

Sport
 Berlin Brandenburg Trophy, of horseracing
 Verbandsliga Berlin-Brandenburg, the Berlin-Brandeburg league
 Gauliga Berlin-Brandenburg (1933–1945), a soccer league
 Oberliga Berlin-Brandenburg (1923–1933), a soccer league

See also
 Brandenburg Gate, in Berlin, Germany
 Flughafen Berlin Brandenburg (disambiguation)
 Berlin (disambiguation)
 Brandenburg (disambiguation)
 Fusion of Berlin and Brandenburg